Pristiphora is a genus of sawfly in the family Tenthredinidae. Some of its species, such as the larch sawfly Pristiphora erichsonii, eat the leaves of economically valuable trees and shrubs, and can be serious pests.

See also
 List of Pristiphora species

References

External links
 
 

Agricultural pest insects
Tenthredinidae
Sawfly genera